Wenn die leere Seele zur Hölle fährt is an EP by Gnaw Their Tongues, independently released on June 30, 2016.

Track listing

Personnel
Adapted from the Wenn die leere Seele zur Hölle fährt liner notes.
 Maurice de Jong (as Mories) – vocals, instruments, recording, cover art

Release history

References

External links 
 Wenn die leere Seele zur Hölle fährt at Bandcamp

2016 EPs
Gnaw Their Tongues albums